Herbert Aleksander Juhan Niiler (27 April 1905 – 13 April 1982) was an Estonian American basketball player and coach.

Niiler was born in Tallinn. He received a degree in physical education from Springfield College in 1928 and then introduced basketball to Estonia. He coached the Estonia men's national basketball team in the 1936 Summer Olympics, where the team placed 9th. He also led Estonia to EuroBasket 1937 and EuroBasket 1939, finishing both in 5th place.

In 1945, he fled from the Soviet occupation with his family via Sweden and Germany to the United States, where they resided in Pittsburgh from 1949 onward.

Niiler died at North Hills Passavant Hospital in 1982.

Family
Oceanographer Pearn P. Niiler is his son.

References and notes

1905 births
1982 deaths
Basketball players from Tallinn
People from Kreis Harrien
Estonian basketball coaches
Estonian men's basketball players
Estonian expatriate basketball people in the United States
Estonian World War II refugees
Estonian emigrants to the United States
Sportspeople from Pittsburgh
Estonia national basketball team coaches